The 2011–12 season will be Brisbane Roar W-League Team's 4th season in the W-League. They will be looking to successfully defend their silverware, having won the Grand Final the season before. On 2 August 2011, the club confirmed they would be supplied with kits and training gear by German multinational apparel company Puma, to which the women's team will wear also. It is the first time in the history of the club and W-League that they will not be wearing a kit that is made by Hummel. On 4 October 2011, 3 weeks out from the start of the 2011–12 A-League season, The World Game reported that the Bakrie Group had struck a 10-year deal to take 70% ownership of the club, with the other 30% being occupied by the FFA.

Squad Lineup for 2011–12 
Correct as of 12 December 2011

Transfers

In

Out

2011–12 Westfield W-League

Finals series

Brisbane Roar advance to Grand Final by winning 4–3 on Penalties

Statistics

Disciplinary record 
Correct as of Grand Final

Goalscorers by round

Ladder

See also 
 Brisbane Roar
 2011–12 W-League
 Brisbane Roar FC records and statistics
 Brisbane Roar end of season awards

References

External links 
 Brisbane Roar website
 A-League website

2011–12
Brisbane Roar